is a Japanese singer and lyre performer. She was born in Osaka Prefecture, Japan, and became famous in 2001 for her song "Itsumo nando demo" (いつも何度でも, "Always With Me"), which served as the closing theme to the popular 2001 anime film Spirited Away by Hayao Miyazaki.

Kimura and Miyazaki had great admiration for each other's works. She was so moved by his 1997 film Princess Mononoke (もののけ姫, Mononoke hime), that she wrote a letter to him, enclosed with a copy of her album. Miyazaki wrote her back and mentioned to her about a film he was currently working on called Rin the Chimney Cleaner (煙突描きのリン Entotsu-kaki no Rin). Hoping Miyazaki would use her material on this film, Kimura, with her lyricist Wakako Kaku (覚 和歌子), wrote a new song called "Itsumo nando demo" (いつも何度でも, "Always With Me"). Miyazaki did like the song, and intended to use it, but the Rin project was eventually scrapped.

Later, Miyazaki started working on his next film Spirited Away, and listened to the song again. Throughout the entire production, he would listen to it obsessively. He would later realize that Kimura's song about finding inner peace meshed perfectly with his coming of age story of a girl who finds her inner strength.

Kimura worked with Miyazaki on Howl's Moving Castle, writing a song for it. (ハウルの動く城, Sekai no yakusoku).

Notes

External links 
 
 Youmi Kimura's official website (Japanese)

California State University alumni
Living people
Japanese women singer-songwriters
Musicians from Osaka Prefecture
Year of birth missing (living people)
20th-century Japanese women singers
20th-century Japanese singers
21st-century Japanese women singers
21st-century Japanese singers